Blake Coburn (born 25 December 1995) is a New Zealand cricketer. 

Coburn was born in Christchurch and educated there at Shirley Boys' High School. A left-arm wrist-spin bowler, he has an unusual bowling action. His torso rotates downward and his head gets below 90 degrees when releasing the ball. 

He made his first-class debut for Canterbury in the 2017–18 Plunket Shield season on 23 October 2017. In November 2017, in his second match, he took 7 for 64 in the second innings to lead Canterbury to victory over Northern Districts by 8 runs. He made his Twenty20 debut for Canterbury in the 2017–18 Super Smash on 17 December 2017.

He made his List A debut for Canterbury in the 2018–19 Ford Trophy on 7 November 2018. After some time out of the Canterbury team, he was awarded a contract for the 2022–23 season.

References

External links
 
 Blake Coburn at Canterbury Cricket

1995 births
Living people
People educated at Shirley Boys' High School
New Zealand cricketers
Cricketers from Christchurch
Canterbury cricketers